Gladiators Treves, for sponsorship reasons known as Römerstrom Gladiators Trier, is a professional basketball club based in Trier, Germany. The club plays in the ProA. Their home arena is Trier Arena, which has a capacity of 5,495 people. From 1990 till 2015 the club existed in the form of TBB Trier, which went bankrupt.

History
The club was founded in 1990, and has played in the top division Basketball Bundesliga since the club's inception. They once were a part of the sports club TV Germania Trier, and became independent after promotion to the Bundesliga.

In the 2014–15 season, TBB relegated after it lost points in the standings because of financial problems. The club was dissolved after the season. However in the 2015 offseason, a new club was founded which was not the legal successor of TBB but inherited the club's license to play in the second tier ProA.

Trophies
German Cup
Champions (2): 1998, 2001

Current roster

Season by season

Notable players

 Bastian Doreth
 Maik Zirbes
 Chris Copeland
 Bernard Thompson

Head coaches

Notes

References

External links
Official website 

Sport in Trier
Basketball teams in Germany
Basketball teams established in 1990
Basketball teams established in 2015